A referendum on the new constitution was held in Thailand on 19 August 2007. Had the draft been rejected, the military government would have had the freedom to choose any previous constitution to adapt and promulgate instead. The turnout was around 60%.

Proposed changes
Major changes in the proposed constitution included the following:
Making almost half of Senators appointed rather than elected.
Limiting the Prime Minister to 2 four-year terms.
Banning the Prime Minister from major holdings in private companies.
Making it easier to impeach the Prime Minister and other ministers.

The military government announced that each household in the country would be sent a copy of the new constitution ahead of the referendum. A poll from July had seen a majority of voters in favour. However, in many cases "yes" votes were not real indicators of support for the new text but rather for quick elections, as the ruling Council for National Security (CNS) has stated that approval of the new constitution was a requirement for holding parliamentary elections later that year.

Results

By region

By province
There were considerable differences in the approval rates between the regions of Thailand. In six provinces of Southern Thailand (Chumphon, Trang, Nakhon Si Thammarat, Songkhla, Surat Thani, Ranong), the approval topped 90%. On the other hand, in 24 provinces in Northern and Northeastern Thailand there was a majority against the draft. In two provinces in the far Northeast (Nakhon Phanom, Roi Et), the rejection even topped 75%.

References

Referendums in Thailand
2007 referendums
Constitutional referendum
Constitution of Thailand
Constitutional referendums